Carlos Curiel (born 30 April 1913, date of death unknown) was a Mexican diver who competed in the 1932 Summer Olympics. He was born in Monterrey. In 1932 he finished fifth in the 10 metre platform event.

References

External links
 

1913 births
Year of death missing
Mexican male divers
Olympic divers of Mexico
Divers at the 1932 Summer Olympics